Leandro Carrijó Silva (born September 3, 1985) is a Brazilian professional footballer who plays as a striker.

Club career

Atlético Mineiro
He made his professional debut for Atlético Mineiro in a 1-1 home draw against Atlético-PR in the Campeonato Brasileiro on June 2, 2007, as a 64th-minute substitute for Éder Luís. 

He scored his first professional goal for Atlético Mineiro in a 4-1 home win over América-RN in the Campeonato Brasileiro on July 19, 2007.

South China
He joined South China in August 2009 and was also registered to play for them in the 2009 AFC Cup. He scored against FK Neftchi Farg'ona in the 4-5 away defeat and then scored the winner in the 1-0 home game to put South China through to the semi-finals. But he failed to score against Kuwait SC in both legs of the semi-final and South China lost the tie 1-3.

TSW Pegasus
He joined TSW Pegasus on loan from South China in January 2011. He was registered as one of the three foreign players of the club in the 2011 AFC Cup. On 13 April 2011, he scored 4 times as TSW Pegasus beat VB Sports Club of Maldives 5:3 in Male. After scoring two more goals against Song Lam Nghe An, Carrijo becomes the leading goalscorer in the 2011 AFC Cup with seven goals.

Return to Brazil
In 2013 Carrijó returned to Brazil for Rio Verde-GO. He was released after the end of Campeonato Goiano.

He joined Mexican club Celaya. He played 11 times and scored 5 goals in 2013–14 Apertura season. He also scored once in 3 games of Apertura 2013 Copa MX.

Honours

Club 

FC Juárez:
 Ascenso MX: Apertura 2015

Atlético Mineiro:
 Minas Gerais State League: 2007

Career statistics

South China
As of 27 March 2012

TSW Pegasus
As of 16 April 2012

References

External links

 zerozero.pt
 Guardian Stats Centre

1985 births
Living people
Brazilian footballers
Clube Atlético Mineiro players
Associação Portuguesa de Desportos players
Brazilian expatriate footballers
Hong Kong First Division League players
Expatriate footballers in Mexico
Expatriate footballers in Hong Kong
South China AA players
Bangu Atlético Clube players
Club Celaya footballers
FC Juárez footballers
El Paso Locomotive FC players
People from Uberaba
Association football forwards
Expatriate soccer players in the United States
Brazilian expatriate sportspeople in Hong Kong
Brazilian expatriate sportspeople in Mexico
Brazilian expatriate sportspeople in the United States
USL Championship players
Sportspeople from Minas Gerais